Micrasterias is a unicellular green alga of the order Desmidiales. Its species vary in size reaching up to hundreds of microns.

Micrasterias displays a bilateral symmetry, with two mirror image semi-cells joined by a narrow isthmus containing the nucleus of the organism. This dual semi-cell structure is unique to the group of green algae to which Micrasterias belongs. Each semi-cell contains a single large chloroplast, the site of photosynthesis for Micrasterias. Chloroplasts within Micrasterias contain chlorophyll a and chlorophyll b and the enzymes required for photosynthesis. The sugar created is used to provide energy for the organism or, if not used, taken up by many small round pyrenoids which are embedded in the chloroplast. They convert the sugar to a starch for storage.

Micrasterias can produce both asexually and sexually. Asexual reproduction occurs via mitosis. When this occurs the genetic material of Micrasterias is duplicated and two small semi-cells grow between the original semi-cells, gradually increasing in size. Sexual reproduction occurs through a process called conjugation whereby two organisms come together and fuse their haploid cells to form a diploid zygote. This zygote typically forms a thick protective wall which can allow the organism to remain dormant for many months to survive cold winters and long droughts. When adequate conditions resume, the zygospore will germinate, undergo meiosis, and produce new haploid algal cells.

Description

Micrasterias species are symmetrical and generally consist of two flattened, identical portions called semicells that are almost entirely filled with chloroplasts, with a nucleus that lies at the center where the two semicells are joined together. The gaps between the two semicells are joined by an isthmus. Each semicell is further divided into a polar lobe and two lateral lobes. These lobes can be further subdivided up to the fourth order. Some species, such as Micrasterias laticeps, have a very different morphology, with unbranched lobes. Except for a single filament-forming species, Micrasterias foliacea, it is found as single cells. As is common in the green algae, the chloroplasts of Micrasterias contain pyrenoids.

Two species of Micrasterias have different morphologies to species traditionally placed in this genus, but molecular phylogenetic analyses demonstrate that they are embedded within Micrasterias. Micrasterias ralfsii (formerly classified as Cosmarium ralfsii) has no lobes, and the cells are smoothly ellipsoidal in outline. Micrasterias dickiei (formerly classified as Staurodesmus dickiei) is triradiate in polar view instead of flattened, and has three spines on each semicell.

Similar genera 
Micrasterias is generally easy to identify due to its shape and typically large size.

The genus Pseudomicrasterias has been split off from the genus Micrasterias, and as of 2023, contains 2 species, formerly known as Micrasterias arcuata. They have a similar morphology to the simpler species of Micrasterias, but molecular phylogenetic analyses show that they are not related.

The genus Prescottiella contains a single species, Prescottiella sudanensis, formerly known as Micrasterias sudanensis. It is distinguished from Micrasterias in that its semicells are not identical, making the cell asymmetrical along one axis; the spines of one semicell curve towards the isthmus, while the spines of the other semicell curve away.

Species

Accepted species

Micrasterias comprises the following species:

 Micrasterias abrupta West & G.S.West
 Micrasterias adscendens Nordstedt
 Micrasterias africana (F.E.Fritsch & F.Rich) Coesel & Van Geest
 Micrasterias alata Wallich
 Micrasterias ambadiensis (Grönblad & A.M.Scott) Kurt Föster
 Micrasterias americana Ehrenberg ex Ralfs
 Micrasterias anomala W.B.Turner
 Micrasterias apiculata Meneghini ex Ralfs
 Micrasterias archeri Coesel & M.Dingley
 Micrasterias bangladeshensis A.K.Islam & Haroon
 Micrasterias bewsii Fritsch & M.F.Rich
 Micrasterias bicoronata A.Kenins
 Micrasterias borgei Willi Krieger
 Micrasterias bourrellyana J.A.Rino
 Micrasterias brachyptera Lundell
 Micrasterias ceratofera Joshua
 Micrasterias compereana Neustupa, St'astný & Skaloud
 Micrasterias conferta Lundell
 Micrasterias croasdaleana C.E.M.Bicudo & L.Sormus
 Micrasterias crux-africana F.J.Cohn
 Micrasterias crux-melitensis Ralfs
 Micrasterias cunningtonii G.S.West
 Micrasterias decemdentata (Nägeli) W.Archer
 Micrasterias denboeri Coesel & Van Geest
 Micrasterias denticulata Brébisson ex Ralfs
 Micrasterias depauperata Nordstedt
 Micrasterias dickiei (Ralfs) Škaloud et al.
 Micrasterias divisa Willi Krieger
 Micrasterias echinata P.E.Brandham
 Micrasterias elegans (W.West & G.S.West) Coesel & Van Geest
 Micrasterias elongata (Schmidle) Coesel & Van Geest
 Micrasterias euastriellopsis Bharati
 Micrasterias excavata (Nordstedt) C.E.M.Bicudo & L.Sormus
 Micrasterias fimbriata Ralfs
 Micrasterias foersteri Thomasson
 Micrasterias foliacea Bailey ex Ralfs
 Micrasterias furcata C.Agardh ex Ralfs
 Micrasterias groenewaldii Claassen
 Micrasterias hardyi G.S.West
 Micrasterias hieronymusii Schmidle
 Micrasterias horrida C.E.Taft
 Micrasterias incisa Ralfs
 Micrasterias inflata C.Bernard
 Micrasterias integra Nordstedt
 Micrasterias jejuensis H.S.Kim
 Micrasterias jenneri Ralfs
 Micrasterias johnsonii West & G.S.West
 Micrasterias khasiae W.B.Turner
 Micrasterias koreana H.S.Kim
 Micrasterias laticeps Nordstedt
 Micrasterias lebrunii Oye
 Micrasterias ledouxii A.M.Scott & Croasdale
 Micrasterias lundii Bourrelly
 Micrasterias lux Joshua
 Micrasterias madagascariensis Coesel
 Micrasterias mahabuleshwarensis J.Hobson
 Micrasterias moebii (O.Borge) West & G.S.West
 Micrasterias muricata Bailey ex Ralfs
 Micrasterias nordstedtiana Wolle
 Micrasterias nordstedtii Thomasson
 Micrasterias nylstromica Claassen
 Micrasterias oscitans Ralfs
 Micrasterias papillifera Brébisson ex Ralfs
 Micrasterias pinnatifida Ralfs
 Micrasterias piquata R.K.Salisbury
 Micrasterias prescottiana C.E.M.Bicudo & L.Sormus
 Micrasterias pseudotorreyi Wolle
 Micrasterias quadridentata (Nordstedt) Grönblad
 Micrasterias quadriverrucosa (Thomasson) C.E.M.Bicudo & L.Sormus
 Micrasterias radians W.B.Turner
 Micrasterias radiosa Ralfs
 Micrasterias ralfsii (Brébisson ex Ralfs) Škaloud et al.
 Micrasterias rotata Ralfs
 Micrasterias sanctipaulensis C.E.M.Bicudo & L.Sormus
 Micrasterias schmidleana Coesel & Van Geest
 Micrasterias schweickerdtii M.I.Claassen
 Micrasterias schweinfurthii Cohn
 Micrasterias semiradiata Brébisson ex Kützing
 Micrasterias sexpinata (Irénée-Marie & Hilliard) H.Croasdale & G.W.Prescott
 Micrasterias simplex Børgesen
 Micrasterias spinosa H.S.Kim
 Micrasterias stauromorpha W.B.Turner
 Micrasterias subaequalis Grönblad
 Micrasterias subdenticulata (Nordstedt) Willi Krieger
 Micrasterias subincisa Willi Krieger
 Micrasterias suboblonga Nordstedt
 Micrasterias subtruncata A.I.Lobik
 Micrasterias tetraptera West & G.S.West
 Micrasterias thomasiana W.Archer
 Micrasterias torreyi Bailey
 Micrasterias triangularis Wolle
 Micrasterias tropica Nordstedt
 Micrasterias truncata Brébisson ex Ralfs
 Micrasterias verrucosa Bisset
 Micrasterias zeylanica F.E.Fritsch

Species names with uncertain taxonomic status
The status of the following species is unresolved:

 Micrasterias aculeata M.Rostock
 Micrasterias berganii H.V.Hauge
 Micrasterias bicaudata (A.K.H.Braun ex Kützing) Kuntze
 Micrasterias bioctonaria G.Rabenhorst
 Micrasterias boryana (P.J.F.Turpin) Ehrenberg
 Micrasterias boryi Kützing
 Micrasterias braunii (C.W.Nägeli ex Kützing) Kuntze
 Micrasterias comperei R.S.Ganem & P.A.C.Senna
 Micrasterias complecta C.G.T.Preuss
 Micrasterias convoluta (A.K.J.Corda) Kuntze
 Micrasterias cordae A.Braun
 Micrasterias coronula Ehrenberg
 Micrasterias cruciata Kützing
 Micrasterias crucigenia Kützing
 Micrasterias decemdentatum (C.W.Nägeli) W.Archer
 Micrasterias denticula Istvanfy
 Micrasterias duplex (Meyen) Kützing
 Micrasterias ecornis Ehrenberg
 Micrasterias eichleri Schmidle
 Micrasterias enneactis Ehrenberg
 Micrasterias extendens W.B.Turner
 Micrasterias falcata Corda
 Micrasterias floridensis R.K.Salisbury
 Micrasterias galeata Borge
 Micrasterias ghibellina Meneghini
 Micrasterias granulata H.C.Wood
 Micrasterias halis Raciborski
 Micrasterias hamata (Wolle) F.C.E.Børgesen
 Micrasterias heliactis Kützing
 Micrasterias heptactis Ehrenberg
 Micrasterias hermanniana Reinsch
 Micrasterias hexactis Ehrenberg
 Micrasterias hexagona G.W.Grant
 Micrasterias hexagonalis F.Steinecke
 Micrasterias kangofurinensis N.Woodhead & R.D.Tweed
 Micrasterias lacerata Kützing
 Micrasterias margaritifera (P.J.F.Turpin) L.A.Brébisson & P.Godet
 Micrasterias mbugensis E.M.Lind
 Micrasterias melitensis G.G.A.Meneghini
 Micrasterias mohii (Borge) Authority Unknown
 Micrasterias multifida Wolle
 Micrasterias napoleonis (P.J.F.Turpin) Kützing
 Micrasterias nordstetiana Wolle
 Micrasterias oblonga Ehrenberg
 Micrasterias ornamentalis O.Borge
 Micrasterias paradoxa Kützing
 Micrasterias platyptera W.B.Turner
 Micrasterias polonica (B.Eichler & R.Gutwinski) West & G.S.West
 Micrasterias polycyclia G.Rabenhorst
 Micrasterias pseudofurcata Wolle
 Micrasterias quadragies-cuspidata (Corda) Ralfs
 Micrasterias renicarpa (Turpin) Kützing
 Micrasterias ricciaeformis C.Agardh
 Micrasterias robusta West & G.S.West
 Micrasterias rosula Kützing
 Micrasterias selenaea Kützing
 Micrasterias senaria Ehrenberg
 Micrasterias simplex (Meyen) Kützing
 Micrasterias simplex Wolle
 Micrasterias simplex Kurt Förster & F.Eckert
 Micrasterias sinuata L.A.Brébisson
 Micrasterias siolii A.M.Scott & Croasdale
 Micrasterias sphaerastrum Kützing
 Micrasterias staurastrum Kützing
 Micrasterias subfimbriata Wolle
 Micrasterias sublagoensis Kurt Förster & F.Eckert
 Micrasterias tetracera Kützing
 Micrasterias tricera Kützing
 Micrasterias tricyclia Ehrenberg
 Micrasterias trigemina E.H.P.A.Haeckel
 Micrasterias upsaliensis (Cleve) W.Archer

Phylogenetics
Modern molecular phylogenetics suggest the following relationships (not all accepted species are included):

Even though Triploceras was recovered as embedded within Micrasterias, there was low statistical support for this placement, so it remains a separate genus.

Habitat and distribution
As with other desmids, Micrasterias grows in freshwater habitats. It prefers oligotrophic to mesotrophic lakes and bogs, often associated with aquatic plants.

Freshwater microalgae, along with other microscopic organisms, are often presumed to be cosmopolitan in distribution (see the Baas Becking hypothesis). However, desmids are an exception to this, likely because of their high morphological complexity allowing for easier identification, and the fact that they mostly do not form resting spores that would allow for wider dispersal. In particular, a number of Micrasterias species are restricted to certain biogeographical realms or continents. For example, Micrasterias muricata appears to be endemic to North America, while Micrasterias ceratofera is restricted to Southeast Asia and northern Australia.

References

External links
Micrasterias Pictures Page

Desmidiaceae
Charophyta genera
Taxa named by Carl Adolph Agardh